Christian Poidevin (born 9 September 1998) is an Australian rugby union player, currently playing for the San Diego Legion of Major League Rugby (MLR) in the U.S. His preferred position is flanker.

Poidevin is the son of former Wallaby Simon Poidevin. He attended Newington College and in 2022 earned a Bachelor’s Degree from the University of New South Wales. He previously played for the LA Giltinis in the MLR.

Professional career
Poidevin signed for Major League Rugby side LA Giltinis ahead of the 2021 Major League Rugby season. He had previously competed in the National Rugby Championship, representing  in the 2018 and 2019 seasons.

References

External links
itsrugby.co.uk Profile

1998 births
Living people
People educated at Newington College
Australian rugby union players
Rugby union flankers
Sydney (NRC team) players
LA Giltinis players
San Diego Legion players